Mongling  is a village in south-eastern Bhutan. It is located in Pemagatshel District.

Population 66 (2005 census).

References

Populated places in Bhutan